Gregor Zallwein (20 October 1712, Oberviechtach, Oberpfalz - 6  or 9 August 1766, Salzburg) was an expert on canon law.

After studying the Humanities at Ratisbon and Freising he took vows at the Benedictine Abbey of Wessobrunn, on 15 November 1733, and was ordained priest on 27 October 1731. He studied canon law at Salzburg from 1737 to 1739, became master of novices at his monastery in 1739, and prior in 1744. Upon the request of the Prince-bishop of Gurk, Joseph Maria Count of Thun, he was sent as professor of canon law to the newly erected seminary at Strasbug in Carinthia. From 1749 till his death he was professor of canon law at the Benedictine University of Salzburg, where he held at the same time the office of "Rector magnificus" from 1759.

Unlike most German canonists of his time, he laid great stress on the sources and historical development of canon law. Though his juristic writings are at times not clear, his lectures were valued very highly and attended even by students from foreign countries. His other canonical works are: Disputatio prima de jure canonico... (Salzburg, 1753);  (Salzburg, 1757);  (Salzburg, 1757).

References

Literature 
 

Canon law jurists
1712 births
1766 deaths